is the Japanese term for a bow.

The  was an important weapon of the samurai warrior during the feudal period of Japan.

History
The bows in these periods were made from a single processed wood, and the bows with this structure were called  and were used until the Nara period (710–794 CE). It is unknown when the asymmetrical  came into use, but the first written record is found in the Book of Wei, a Chinese historical manuscript dating to the 3rd century CE, which describes the people of the Japanese islands using "spears, shields, and wooden bows for arms; the wooden bows are made with the lower limbs short and the upper limbs long; and bamboo arrows with points of either iron or bone." The oldest asymmetrical  found to date was discovered in Nara Prefecture, and is estimated to be from the 5th century.

In the Nara period, lacquered bows with more weather resistance and decorative features appeared. Euonymus hamiltonianus, Zelkova serrata, and Toxicodendron succedaneum, which are highly elastic wood, came to be used for making , and many  became as long as roughly 7  3 , increasing their power and range. Since then, the structure of the bow has gradually evolved, but its length of roughly 7  3  has been passed down to the present day.

In the Muromachi period (1336–1573), the  went from its luxurious exterior to a piece of equipment that symbolized the rank of commander.

The  was developed during the Muromachi period, and bamboo was used on the side of the bow to increase its range and power.

During the Sengoku period (1467–1615), the  used in modern  was developed, completing the original form of the Japanese bow now known around the world. The characteristic of the bow is that it has a greatly changed laminated structure from the conventional bow. The core of the structure is about four pieces of bonded bamboo, with bamboo glued to the front side and the other side and wood glued to the sides. However, because  took a long time to load, were inconvenient in rainy weather when damp gunpowder would not fire, and were not exactly subtle in terms of noise, the  did not go out of fashion and continued to be used as an important military force on the battlefield.

When Japanese society became more peaceful in the Edo period (1603–1867), the spirituality and decorativeness of the  became important, and  developed as a samurai's way of doing things.

Shape 
They are traditionally made by laminating bamboo, wood and leather, using techniques which have not changed for centuries, although some archers (particularly beginners) may use a synthetic .

The  is asymmetrical; according to the All Nippon Kyudo Federation, the grip has to be positioned at about two thirds of the distance from the upper tip.

The upper and lower curves also differ. Several hypotheses have been offered for this asymmetric shape. Some believe it was designed for use on a horse, where the  could be moved from one side of the horse to the other with ease; however, there is evidence that the asymmetrical shape predates its use on horseback.

Others claim that asymmetry was needed to enable shooting from a kneeling position. Yet another explanation is the characteristics of the wood from a time before laminating techniques. In case the bow is made from a single piece of wood, its modulus of elasticity is different between the part taken from the treetop side and the other side. A lower grip balances it.

The hand holding the  may also experience less vibration due to the grip being on a vibration node of the bow. A perfectly uniform pole has nodes at 1/4 and 3/4 of the way from the ends, or 1/2 if held taut at the ends – these positions will change significantly with shape and consistency of the bow material.

String 

However, it can also be made of strands of waxed bamboo.

Care and maintenance 
A bamboo  requires careful attention. Left unattended, the  can warp out of shape and may eventually become unusable.  The shape of a  will change through normal use and can be re-formed when needed through manual application of pressure, through shaping blocks, or by leaving it strung or unstrung when not in use.

A well cared-for  can last many generations, while the usable life of a mistreated  can be very short.

Bow lengths

Gallery

Popular culture
  are featured in the Teenage Mutant Ninja Turtles franchise, used by Splinter in Teenage Mutant Ninja Turtles II: The Secret of the Ooze and the 2003 episode "Exodus, Part 1". The Foot Clan includes Foot Archers who use . A  bow was used by Murakami Gennosuke, a rhino bounty hunter in the 2003 episode "The Real World, Part 1".
 Power Rangers Samurai features the Blue Ranger Kevin Douglas using the Hydro Bow, which is based on a  bow.  
  bows were used by samurai in Deadliest Warrior and The Last Samurai.
 The character Hanzo Shimada from  Overwatch uses a futuristic yumi as his weapon of choice due to him abandoning the way of the sword after nearly killing his brother Genji.

See also

References

Further reading

External links

Bows (archery)
Bamboo weapons
Medieval archery
Archery equipment of Japan
Samurai weapons and equipment
Japanese words and phrases